Comets on Fire is the debut album from Santa Cruz psychedelic rock band Comets on Fire. It was released in 2001 by Alternative Tentacles.

Track listing
 "All I Need" – 2:56
 "Graverobbers" – 4:40
 "One Foot" – 5:57
 "Got a Feelin" – 2:03
 "Rimbaud Blues" – 0:41
 "Let's Take It All" – 3:57
 "The Way Down" – 3:29
 "Comets on Fire" – 1:57
 "Ghost of the Cosmos" – 6:06
 "Days of Vapors" – 28:11

Personnel 

Raeni Bullock – Photography
Comets on Fire – Engineer, Mixing
Chris Gonzales – Drums
Tim Green – Mixing
Graham McGrew – Photography
Ethan Miller – Guitar (Electric), Vocals
Dick Tap'n – Live Recording

References

External links
Comets on Fire Official website

Comets on Fire albums
2001 debut albums
Alternative Tentacles albums